The WTO-FTA Moot or Asian WTO Moot is an annual international moot court competition that began in 2010. Hosted in Seoul, the competition is sponsored by the South Korean Ministry of Trade, Energy, and Trade and the Korean Society of International Economic Law. Judges in the competition include members of the Appellate Body of the World Trade Organization. Teams have to go through two preliminary rounds before the top eight teams by score advance to the first round of knockouts. The competition mainly comprises Korean teams, but since 2015 foreign schools have been invited to participate every year.

Competition records

References

International law
Moot court competitions
World Trade Organization